Dialysis may refer to:

Dialysis (chemistry), a process of separating molecules in solution
Electrodialysis, used to transport salt ions from one solution to another through an ion-exchange membrane under the influence of an applied electric potential
Kidney dialysis is the process of removing water, solutes and toxins from the blood of individuals with compromised kidney function, primary types of which are:
 Hemodialysis
 Peritoneal dialysis
 Hemofiltration
Liver dialysis, a detoxification treatment for liver failure
Dialysis (fly), a genus of insects in the family Xylophagidae